Povedadaphne is a genus of plants in the family Lauraceae, with a single species, Povedadaphne quadriporata. They are evergreen "lauroid" trees belonging to the tropical laurel forest habitat, a type of cloud forest in Costa Rica, in Central America.

Overview
The genus name, laurel of Poveda, is dedicated to Luis J. Poveda Alvarez. Professor of National University of Costa Rica. Where the single species of genus has been found. Povedadaphne is related with neotropical Lauraceae genus Williamodendron, by the position of the anther cells, at the flat apical portion, of the anthers, which is unusual in Lauraceae. The genus is characterized by an extremely rare combination of characters that have occurred in the species in its own distinct genus. There is little information regarding the species due to its scarcity.
 
Povedadaphne quadriporata is an evergreen hermaphrodite tree of 25 m tall, of tropical mountain Cloud forest with leathery leaves alternate, simple and entire. The flowers are bisexual. Known from sites in the San Ramón Forest Reserve, near Ciudad Quesada and east of Sarapiquí river, in Heredia Province of Costa Rica.

References
 

Lauraceae genera
Monotypic Laurales genera
Taxonomy articles created by Polbot
Lauraceae